Fethia Khaïri (1918-1986) (Arabic: فتحية خيري) was a Tunisian singer and actress between 1940 and 1950.
 She was characterized by her soft voice and suave ability to change tone and register.

Singing
In 1936, she recorded three successful songs: 
 Zaâma ysafi eddahr, 
 Hal kammoun mnein (a success of Chafia Rochdi) and 
 Vous dansez madame (sung in French-Arabic).

Acting Roles
She quickly became a celebrity and the star of several acting troupes, including that of Fadhila Khetmi, especially in singing roles, at a time when the theater was the main leisure of the Tunisian public. She acted in several plays:

 Louis XI (son premier rôle)
 Le baiser mortel
 La main maléfique
 Hamdoun
 Les martyrs du patriotisme
 Ali Baba
 Les filles d'aujourd'hui
 Le fils du peuple
 Le gentil commissaire
 Wallâda et Ibn Zeydoun
 Cléopâtre

References

1918 births
1986 deaths
20th-century Tunisian women singers
People from Dahmani